The 2022–23 season is the 107th in the history of SV Sandhausen and their 11th consecutive season in the second division. The club will participate in the 2. Bundesliga and DFB-Pokal.

Players

Out on loan

Transfers

In

Out

Pre-season and friendlies

Competitions

Overall record

2. Bundesliga

League table

Results summary

Results by round

Matches 
The league fixtures were announced on 17 June 2022.

DFB-Pokal

References

SV Sandhausen seasons
SV Sandhausen